The women's 1500 metres at the 2011 Asian Athletics Championships was held at the Kobe Universiade Memorial Stadium on 8 July.

Results

References
Results

1500 metres
1500 metres at the Asian Athletics Championships
2011 in women's athletics